The 1980 Pacific Tigers football team represented the University of the Pacific (UOP) in the 1980 NCAA Division I-A football season as a member of the Pacific Coast Athletic Association.

The team was led by head coach Bob Toledo, in his second year, and played their home games at Pacific Memorial Stadium in Stockton, California. The Tigers finished the season with a record of four wins and eight losses (4–8, 1–4 PCAA), and were outscored 211 to 330.

Schedule

NFL Draft
One UOP Tiger was selected in the 1981 NFL Draft.

Notes

References

External links
 Official game program: Pacific at Washington State – October 4, 1980

Pacific
Pacific Tigers football seasons
Pacific Tigers football